The Danish Player of the Year award is an annual prize, which has been given to the best male Danish football player by the Danish Football Association since 1963. The winner is decided in a vote among the professional Danish footballers. Since 2000, there has also been an award for the top female player. The winner is decided by a vote among all Elitedivisionen players.

Jens Petersen was the first player to win the award in 1963. When receiving the award in 1975, Henning Munk Jensen became the first player to win the prize for a second time. Up until 1978, the Danish Football Association's rule of amateurism meant only players in the domestic league could win the prize. Even after the emergence of paid football in Denmark in 1978, no players in foreign clubs were eligible for the award - in part, the reason why 1977 European Footballer of the Year striker Allan Simonsen didn't win the award, as he played abroad from 1972 to 1983. When the award was finally opened to all Danish players in 1983, national team captain Morten Olsen was the first player to win the award. 

The record title holder is Pernille Harder, who has seven honours; the record male holder is Christian Eriksen, with five. Brøndby IF is the football club with most players selected for the award.

Winners

Men

Women

Danish Football Association's award 

Since 2006 the Danish Football Association, in association with the TV-station TV2, has also given an award to the best football player in Denmark. The winner of the award is announced at the annual award show called Dansk Fodbold Award.

The past winners of DBUs "Danish player of the year".

Young Players of the Year
Sponsored by Arla Foods, the awards were initially known as Mælkens talentpriser (the milk's talent awards) in order to promote the line of dairy products of the company then known as "MD Foods". DBU found new sponsor DONG (later DONG Energy), an oil company, in 2004 but Arla went on to sponsor the prize which was renamed Arla's talentpriser (Arla's talent awards) in 2005. 

(*) Players who have played at least one match for the senior national team.

See also

 List of sports awards honoring women

External links
Official page (Danish Football Player Association)
Official page (Danish Football Association)

        
Association football player of the year awards by nationality
1963 establishments in Denmark
Awards established in 1963
Danish awards
Annual events in Denmark
Women's association football player of the year awards
Association football player non-biographical articles